Brian Hallisay (born October 31, 1978) is an American actor, known for his roles as Will Davis in the CW drama series Privileged and Kyle Parks in the Lifetime drama series The Client List. He starred on the television series Revenge as Ben Hunter.

Early life
Hallisay was born in Washington, D.C., graduated from Gonzaga College High School in 1996 and then moved on to Cornell University, graduating in 2000. After college and before moving to Los Angeles, he worked on Wall Street. Regarding the career change, he commented: "I was slaving away at that and I had a really good time with it, but it got to the point where I said, 'You know, I had always dreamed about seeing what acting was all about.'"

Career
Hallisay made his television debut in 2005, appearing on Fox's The Inside, with Rachel Nichols and Adam Baldwin, as well as Lifetime's Strong Medicine, opposite Patricia Richardson.

On The CW's drama Privileged, Hallisay played Will Davis, a charming and wealthy Palm Beach bachelor who is delighted to learn that his next-door neighbors have hired a beautiful tutor named Megan Smith (Joanna García). He  continued in various television series, such as Without a Trace and Cold Case. Since then, he has landed roles in Bones, Medium, Bionic Woman, and CSI: NY, opposite Gary Sinise.

In 2006, he made his feature debut in Erik MacArthur's Bottoms Up, starring Paris Hilton and Jason Mewes. Hallisay played the boyfriend to Hilton, a socialite who helps Mewes save his failing small-town restaurant. In 2011, Hallisay was cast in the third installment of Hostel where he played the lead character. In 2012, Hallisay appeared in two episodes of The CW's series Ringer, and he signed a deal with Lifetime to appear as Kyle Parks in the drama series The Client List.

From late 2018 to early 2019, Hallisay played a recurring role on 9-1-1 as Doug Kendall alias Jason Bailey, the abusive husband of Maddie Buckley, a character played by his real-life wife, Jennifer Love Hewitt.

Personal life
In March 2012, Hallisay began dating his The Client List co-star Jennifer Love Hewitt. In June 2013, it was announced that Hewitt and Hallisay were engaged and expecting their first child. They married November 20, 2013, before the birth of their first child, a daughter, Autumn James. In June 2015, the couple had a boy, Atticus James. In September 2021, Hewitt and Hallisay welcomed their third child, a son named Aidan James.

Filmography

References

External links
 
 Interview at Starry Constellation Magazine

1978 births
21st-century American male actors
American male film actors
American male television actors
Cornell University alumni
Gonzaga College High School alumni
Living people
Male actors from Washington, D.C.